The 2010–11 Czech 1.liga season was the 18th season of the Czech 1.liga, the second level of ice hockey in the Czech Republic. 16 teams participated in the league, and HC Slovan Ústečtí Lvi won the championship.

First round

Second round

Group A

Group B

Pre-Playoffs 
HC Rebel Havlíčkův Brod – SK Kadaň
 HC Rebel Havlíčkův Brod - SK Kadaň 4:3 OT (0:0, 2:1, 1:2, 1:0)
 HC Rebel Havlíčkův Brod - SK Kadaň 4:2 (1:0, 3:0, 0:2)
 SK Kadaň - HC Rebel Havlíčkův Brod 4:3 OT (0:0, 2:1, 1:2, 1:0)
 SK Kadaň - HC Rebel Havlíčkův Brod 3:6 (1:1, 0:2, 2:3)
HC Rebel Havlíčkův Brod qualified for the playoffs.

 Orli Znojmo – HC Benátky nad Jizerou
 Orli Znojmo - HC Benátky nad Jizerou 1:3 (1:2, 0:1, 0:0)
 Orli Znojmo - HC Benátky nad Jizerou 2:1 OT (0:0, 1:1, 0:0, 1:0)
 HC Benátky nad Jizerou - Orli Znojmo 7:1 (3:1, 3:0, 1:0)
 HC Benátky nad Jizerou - Orli Znojmo 1:2 (0:1, 0:1 1:0)
 Orli Znojmo - HC Benátky nad Jizerou 5:1 (2:0, 1:0 2:1)
Orli Znojmo qualified for the playoffs

HC Berounští Medvědi – HC Vrchlabí
 HC Berounští Medvědi - HC Vrchlabí 0:4 (0:1, 0:1, 0:2)
 HC Berounští Medvědi - HC Vrchlabí 3:2 (1:0, 1:1, 1:1)
 HC Vrchlabí - HC Berounští Medvědi 3:0 (1:0, 1:0, 1:0)
 HC Vrchlabí - HC Berounští Medvědi 3:0 (1:0, 0:0, 2:0)
HC Vrchlabí qualified for the playoffs.

HC VCES Hradec Králové – SK Horácká Slavia Třebíč
 HC VCES Hradec Králové - SK Horácká Slavia Třebíč 3:1 (1:1, 1:0, 1:0)
 HC VCES Hradec Králové - SK Horácká Slavia Třebíč 5:2 (0:0, 2:2, 3:0)
 SK Horácká Slavia Třebíč - HC VCES Hradec Králové 4:1 (2:0, 0:1, 2:0)
 SK Horácká Slavia Třebíč - HC VCES Hradec Králové 2:4 (0:2, 1:1, 1:1)
HC VCES Hradec Králové qualified for the playoffs.

Playoffs

Relegation

External links 
 Season on hockeyarchives.info

2
Czech
Czech 1. Liga seasons